Paweł Mateusz Machcewicz (born April 27, 1966 in Warsaw) is a Polish historian and university professor.

Biography
Machcewicz graduated in 1989 from the Department of History at the University of Warsaw. In 1990 he became a research analyst at the Institute of History of the Polish Academy of Sciences. In 1993 Machcewicz defended the doctorate, and in 2000 received a post-doctoral degree in Humanities in the field of Political Theories. He was a grant recipient from the Fulbright Foundation of the Georgetown University and from the Spanish Ministry of Foreign Affairs among others. In 2009 Machcewicz received a title of the Professor of Humanities at the Nicolaus Copernicus University in Toruń. He lectures also at the Collegium Civitas.

Career
In 1999-2006 Paweł Machcewicz acted as the editor of one of the featured departments of the historical magazine "Mówią wieki". From 2000 to 2006 he served as president of the Biuro Edukacji Publicznej (Bureau of Public Education) at the Institute of National Remembrance (IPN). In 2007 he ran as candidate to the Kolegium office of the IPN from the recommendation of Members of Parliament of the Civic Platform.

On September 1, 2008, Machcewicz became one of principal advisers to the Prime Minister of Poland Donald Tusk, and an attorney in the Office of the President of Rada Ministrów (Council of Ministers) appointed to the Museum of the Second World War in Gdańsk. He was honoured with a Jerzy Giedroyc prize among others. Married, with two children.

Selected publications 
Der Beginn der Vernichtung. Zum Mord an den Juden in Jedwabne und Umgebung im Sommer 1941 (co-author), 2004
Emigracja w polityce międzynarodowej, 1999
Historia Hiszpanii (co-author), 1998
"Monachijska menażeria", walka z Radiem Wolna Europa 1950-1989, 2007
Polski rok 1956, 1993
Władysław Gomułka, 1995
Wokół Jedwabnego vol. 1-2 (ed.), 2002
Zranione miasto. Poznań w czerwcu 1956 roku (co-author), 2003
Rebellious Satellite: Poland 1956, 2009

References 
  
  

Living people
20th-century Polish historians
Polish male non-fiction writers
1966 births
University of Warsaw alumni
Academic staff of Nicolaus Copernicus University in Toruń
Writers from Warsaw
People associated with the Institute of National Remembrance
21st-century Polish historians
Fulbright alumni